() is a colloquial term in Czech and Slovak for a panel building constructed of pre-fabricated, pre-stressed concrete, such as those extant in the former Czechoslovakia and elsewhere in the world. Paneláks are usually located in housing estates (Czech: sídliště, Slovak: sídlisko).

 [plural: ] is derived from the standard  or  meaning, literally, "panel house / prefabricated-sections house". The term panelák is used mainly for the elongate blocks with more sections with separate entrances – simple panel tower blocks are called "věžový dům" (tower house) or colloquially "věžák". The buildings remain a towering, highly visible reminder of the communist era. The term panelák refers specifically to buildings in the former Czechoslovakia. However, similar buildings were a common feature of urban planning in communist countries and even in the West.

History

Interwar Czechoslovakia saw many constructivist architects in the country, such as Vladimír Karfík and František Lydie Gahura, many of whom would maintain prominence following the establishment of the Czechoslovak People's Republic in 1948. In the years following 1948, the Czechoslovakian architectural scene favored Stalinist architecture over more modern architecture. However, a 1954 speech by Nikita Khrushchev encouraging the construction of panel buildings, coupled by post-war housing shortages faced throughout both eastern and western Europe, encouraged the country's architectures to construct more simplistic, modernist buildings. By the late 1960s, the country's paneláks often reached up to 16 stories in height. The 

 As of 2005, they housed about 3.5 million people, or about one-third of the country's population.

Following the country's Velvet Revolution in 1989, there was widespread speculation that the country's paneláks would fall out of favor, due to their simplicity and small size. The Czech government sold the paneláks to their tenants for cheap prices, furthering speculation that the apartments would be undesirable. However, these fears have not materialized.

Characteristics

A typical panelák apartment has a foyer, bathroom, kitchen, a living room also used for dining, and a bedroom. All paneláks in the Czech Republic were constructed to follow one of sixteen design patterns.

Paneláks have been criticized for their simplistic design, poor-quality building materials, and their tendency to become overcrowded. In 1990, Václav Havel, who was then the president of Czechoslovakia, called paneláks "undignified rabbit pens, slated for liquidation". Panelák housing estates as a whole are said to be mere bedroom communities with few conveniences and even less character.

However, paneláks have also been praised by many. Upon their introduction, paneláks offered more reliable heating, hot water, and plumbing than existing buildings, especially those in rural locations. The buildings typically offered large amounts of natural light, compared to their older counterparts.

Paneláks today

Paneláks remain commonplace today, and have attracted a wide diversity of social classes. Fears that paneláks would become undesirable and be subject to middle class flight, commonplace following the Velvet Revolution, have not materialized.  Panelák apartments have risen in value more than brick apartments, have been praised for housing people from a wide variety of incomes, and have been subject to a number of positive cultural depictions including magazines and TV shows. 

Areas with high shares of its population living in paneláks include the city of Karvina (where approximately 97% of people live in them), Petržalka,, and the city of Most (approx. 80%). Most's historical city was largely torn down due to the spread of coal mining and the majority of its population was moved into paneláks.

Amenities 
Some Czech sociologists fear that panelák inhabitants may lack amenities, and suffer from being unable to physically access distant businesses and commercial centres. To combat this, certain local authorities are making significant efforts to prevent this scenario by changing bedroom communities into multifunctional urban neighbourhoods. This may include support for the construction of missing facilities, such as shopping centres, churches, or improved transport accessibility.

Paneláks, particularly in big cities, are often the first targets for builders of telecommunication networks, as the housing estates combine a high concentration of people with easy access to underground and in-house spaces for cables. Panelák housing estates are usually the first neighbourhoods with access to cable TV, WiFi network coverage, cable-modem service, DSL and other telecommunication services.

Renovations 
In March 2005, the director of the Czech Ministry of Regional Development expressed concerns that the country's paneláks were near the end of their lifespan, citing an increasing number of structural incidents. He estimated that his agency would need 400 billion Czech koruna to modernize the country's paneláks, and 1.5 trillion to tear them down entirely.

In recent years, many paneláks have been renovated, partially due to funds from the European Union. A sizable renovation market has formed in recent years, and even a home magazine, Panel Plus, exists to give renovators ideas.

Ownership 
Following the Velvet Revolution, most paneláks were sold to their tenants at low costs. Many panelák flats are now the property of their inhabitants, though they are also rented out through private landlords. The buildings are often managed by housing cooperatives, municipalities, self-governing non-profit organizations, or through public-private partnership.

Other countries

Buildings similar to paneláks were built also in other communist countries, and they are a common feature of cityscapes across Central and Eastern Europe, and to some degree Northern Europe.

One of the most drastic reconstruction policies of the Eastern Bloc was the systematization programme that took place in the 1970s and 1980s under Nicolae Ceaușescu in Romania. In 1971 Ceaușescu visited North Korea and was impressed by the Juche ideology. He enacted a mass programme of demolition and reconstruction of existing villages, towns, and cities, in whole or in part, in order to build blocks of flats (blocuri).

In Bulgaria, buildings similar to paneláks are colloquially known as "panelki", and are the predominant type of en masse housing throughout the country. In Hungary, similar buildings are called panelház. In Poland, they are called "bloki" (blocks), or "wielka płyta" (the great panel). In Germany they are known as Plattenbau. Most buildings in Soviet-era Microdistricts are panel buildings.

In the European Union, among former communist countries, a majority of the population lives in flats in Latvia (65.1%), Estonia (63.8%), Lithuania (58.4%), Czech Republic (52.8%) and Slovakia (50.3%) (as of 2014, data from Eurostat). However, not all flat dwellers in Eastern Europe live in communist era blocks of flats; many live in buildings constructed after the fall of communism, and some in buildings surviving from the era before communism.

In the United States, some housing estates have buildings that are similar or actually are paneláks, or they are built from the same or similar material.

Popular culture
 The movie Panelstory from Věra Chytilová shows the life of several inhabitants in a real unfinished communist-bloc apartment project. Awarded a Great Prize in San Remo in 1980.
 Béla Tarr's film Panelkapcsolat tells a doomed love story set in a similar housing project in Hungary. Special Mention at the 1982 Locarno Film Festival.
 Polish director Krzysztof Kieślowski's celebrated Dekalog series is set in a wielka płyta housing estate in Warsaw, Poland.
 The long-running Slovak TV show Panelák focused on the residents of a single block in Bratislava.

See also

Sídlisko (Slovakia)
Housing estate
Public housing
Affordable housing
Subsidized housing
Subsidized housing in the United States
Section 8 (USA)

 Khrushchyovka (Former Soviet Union)

 Panelház (Hungary)
 Million Programme (Sweden)
 Plattenbau (Germany)
 Brutalist architecture

Minimalism

References
Bibliography
 Stankova, Jaroslava, et al. (1992) Prague: Eleven Centuries of Architecture. Prague: PAV. .
 Zarecor, Kimberly Elman (2011) Manufacturing a Socialist Modernity: Housing in Czechoslovakia, 1945–1960. Pittsburgh: University of Pittsburgh Press. .
 Chánov case study
Notes

External links
 Website about panelaks in the Czech Republic (in Czech)

Urban planning in the Czech Republic
Architecture in the Czech Republic
Public housing
Economy of Czechoslovakia
Prefabricated buildings
Concrete buildings and structures